The Importation Act 1337 (11 Edw. 3, c. 3) was an Act of the Parliament of England passed during the reign of Edward III.

The Act prohibited the importation of foreign made cloth in order to encourage the English cloth making industry.

Notes

Acts of the Parliament of England
1330s in law
1337 in England
Protectionism